Beth Harbison is an American author of women's fiction. As Elizabeth Harbison, she has written romance novels and cookbooks.

Harbison grew up in Potomac, Maryland. She attended the University of London, Birkbeck College, and received a bachelor's degree from the University of Maryland.

Her 2007 novel Shoe Addicts Anonymous was her first New York Times bestseller and it may be adapted into a film directed by Galgos Entertainment with Paul Weiland directing, and starring Halle Berry.

She currently has one son and one daughter, John Henry Harbison and Mary Paige Harbison.

Bibliography

As Beth Harbison
 Shoe Addicts Anonymous, St. Martin's Griffin, 2007
 Secrets of a Shoe Addict, St. Martin's Griffin, 2008
 Hope in a Jar, St. Martin's Griffin, 2009
 Thin, Rich, Pretty, St. Martin's Griffin, 2010
 Always Something There to Remind Me, St. Martin's Press, 2011
 When in Doubt, Add Butter, St. Martin's Press, 2012
 Chose the Wrong Guy, Gave Him the Wrong Finger, St. Martin's Press, 2013
 Driving with the Top Down, St. Martin's Press, 2014
Head Over Heels, Harlquin MIRA, 2014
 If I Could Turn Back Time, St. Martin's Press, 2015
 One Less Problem Without You, St. Martin's Press, 2016
A Shoe Addict's Christmas, St. Martin's Press, 2016
Every Time You Go Away, St. Martin's Press, 2018
The Cookbook Club, William Morris, 2020

As Elizabeth Harbison

Romance Novels
 A Groom for Maggie, Silhouette, 1997
 Wife Without a Past (Fabulous Fathers), Silhouette, 1997
 True Love Ranch, Silhouette, 1998
 Two Brothers and a Bride, Silhouette, 1998 	
 Emma and the Earl (Cinderella Brides), Silhouette, 1999
 Plain Jane Marries the Boss, Silhouette, 1999
 Annie and the Prince (Cinderella Brides), Silhouette, 2000 	
 His Secret Heir (Cinderella Brides), Silhouette, 2001
 Pregnant Proposal, Silhouette, 2001
 Drive Me Wild, Silhouette, 2002 	
 Mission Creek Mother-to-Be, Silhouette, 2002
 Midnight Cravings, Silhouette, 2003 	
 Princess Takes a Holiday, Silhouette, 2003
 Diary of a Domestic Goddess, Silhouette, 2005 	
 How to Get Your Man, Silhouette, 2005
 The Secret Princess, Mills and Boon, 2005 	
 Taming of the Two, Silhouette, 2005 	
 A Dash of Romance, Silhouette, 2006
 Falling for the Boss, Silhouette, 2006 	
 If the Slipper Fits, Silhouette, 2006
 In Her Boss's Arms, Silhouette, 2007

Cookbooks
 A Taste for Love: A Romantic Cookbook for Two, 1996
 Loaves of Fun: A History of Bread with Activities and Recipes from Around the World, Chicago Review Press, 1999
 Bread Machine Baker, Gramercy Books, 2001 	
 Four Seasons with the Bread Machine Baker, Gramercy Books, 2001

References

External links
 Beth Harbison’s website
 Beth Harbison on Macmillan’s website
 Elizabeth Harbison on the Harlequin website
Beth Harbison on Twitter
Beth Harbison on Instagram

Living people
People from Potomac, Maryland
University of Maryland, College Park alumni
American fiction writers
American women writers
Year of birth missing (living people)
American romantic fiction novelists
American cookbook writers
Women cookbook writers
21st-century American women